A list of works by the composer Stefan Wolpe.

Source:

Compositions

Orchestral works
Zwei Studien fur Grosses Orchester (1933)
Passacaglia for Full Orchestra (1937)
The Man from Midian: First Suite (1942)
Symphony No. 1 (1956)

Chamber works
Duo für Zwei Geigen, violin duo (1924)
Musik zu Hamlet, flute, clarinet and cello (1929)
Drei Kleinere Canons in der Umkehrung Zweier 12-tönig Correspondierenden Hexachorde, viola and cello (1936)
Suite im Hexachord, oboe and clarinet (1936)
Lied, Anrede, Hymnus, Strophe zärteste Bewegung, oboe and piano (1939)
Sonata for Oboe and Piano (1941)
Sonata for Violin and Piano (1949)
Quartet for Trumpet, Tenor Saxophone, Percussion, and Piano (1950, rev. 1954)
Twelve Pieces for String Quartet (1950)
Piece For Oboe, Cello, Percussion, and Piano (1955)
Quintet with Voice, baritone, clarinet, horn, cello, harp, piano (1957)
Piece in Two Parts for Flute and Piano (1960)
Piece for Piano and Sixteen Instruments (1961)
In Two Parts for Six Players, clarinet, trumpet, violin, cello, harp, piano (1962)
Piece for Two Instrumental Units, large mixed ensemble (1963)
Chamber Piece No. 1, chamber orchestra (1964)
Trio in Two Parts, flute, cello and piano (1964)
Piece in Two Parts for Violin Alone (1964)
Second Piece for Violin Alone (1966)
Solo Piece for Trumpet (1966)
Chamber Piece No. 2, chamber orchestra (1967)
From Here On Farther, mixed quartet (1969)
String Quartet (1969)
Piece for Trumpet and Seven Instruments (1971)

Piano works
Adagio (1920)
Gesang: Weil Ich Etwas Teures Verlassen Muss (1920)
Vier Adagien (1920)
Drei Klavierstücke (1923)
Early Piece for Piano (1925)
Stehende Musik (1925)
Rag-Caprice (1927)
Tango (1927)
Presto agitato (1929)
Tanz (Charleston) (1929)
March and Variations for Two Pianos (1933)
Cinq Marches Caracteristiques (1928–1934)
Zärtliche Addresse an Irmas 32 Geburtstag (1934)
Four Studies on Basic Rows (1936)
Dance in the Form of a Chaconne (1939)
Pastoral (1941)
Toccata in Three Parts for Piano (1941)
Zemach Suite (1941)
The Good Spirit of a Right Cause (1942)
The Man from Midian (1942)
Battle Piece (1943–1947)
Two Studies for Piano, Part II (1948)
Music for Any Instruments: Interval Studies (1944–1949)
Music for a Dancer (1950)
Seven Pieces for Three Pianos (1951)
Waltz for Merle (1952)
Enactments for Three Pianos (1953)
Form for Piano (1959)
Form IV: Broken Sequences (1969)
Fuge a 3 (undated)
Invention: Canon (undated)

Chamber operas
Zeus und Elida: A Musical Grotesque (1928)
Schöne Geschichten (1927–1929)

Cantatas
Cantata vom Sport, unision chorus and ensemble (1932)
Yigdal, baritone, SATB, organ (1945)
Lazy Andy Ant, singer/narrator, two pianos (1947)
Street Music: A Counter-offering to the Musical Offerings of Ten Composers on my 60th Birthday, baritone, narrator, flute, oboe, clarinet, cello, piano (1962)
Cantata for Mezzo-soprano, Three Women's Voices, and Instruments (1963)

Incidental Music
Schattenspiel-Musik, soprano, mezzo-soprano, alto (1923)
Da Leigt der Hund Begraben, voices, trumpet, saxophone, percussion, piano (1932)
La Malade imaginaire, flute, clarinet, violin, viola, double-bass (1934)
Palestine, flute, violin, viola, cello, piano (1941)
The Good Woman of Setzuan, voices, piano (1953)
Peer Gynt, voices, piano (1954)
King Oedipus: Music of Introduction and Setting the frame to the choruses, speakers, piano (1957)
The Hour Glass, voice, piano (1958)
The Tempest, chamber ensemble (1960)
The Exception and the Rule, voices, trumpet, clarinet, bassoon, percussion, piano (1961)

Songs
Früheste Leider (1920)
Fünf Lieder von Friedrich Hölderlin, mezzo-soprano or alto (1924, 1927, rev. 1936)
Drei Lieder Nach Heinrich von Kleist, soprano (1925)
Neun Vertonungen aus Gitanjali von Rabindranath Tagore, alto (1926)
Zwei Fabeln für Bariton und Klavier (1926)
Ja Wohl Es Muss die Ehrlichkeit (1928)
An Anna Blume von Kurt Schwitters, tenor (1929)
Blues, speaker, 2 saxophones, trumpet, percussion, 2 pianos (1929)
Decret No. 2 an die Armee der Künstler, soprano (1929)
Fantasie von Übermorgen, medium voice (1929)
Zwei Lieder von Lenin und Weh, medium voice (1929)
Auch die Kleinste Tat, pianist-speaker (1930
Politische Satiren, medium voice (1929–1930)
Drei Arbeitslieder, medium voice (1929–1930)
Acht Lieder auf Texte von Heine, Ottwald, Weinert, und Anderen, medium voice (1929–1930)
Agitprop Lieder, medium voice (1931)
Zwei Lieder von Ernst Ottwald, medium voice (1931)
Proletarische Selbstkritik, medium voice (1932)
Simple Songs for the People, medium voice (1929–1932)
Agitprop Lieder (1930–1933)
We Are One Driven Tortured Flock, baritone (1935)
Ssim Shalom (1936)
Three Songs for Medium Voice and Piano (1936)
Ve Hinehu, medium voice (1936?)
Two Songs for Alto and Piano from The Song of Songs (1937)
Vier Lieder für Alt oder Bariton und Klavier (1938)
Epitaph, low voice (1938)
Four Songs (1934–38)
If It Be My Fate, low voice (1938)
La-Menatzeach al Ha-Mecholot (To the Dancemaster), mezzo-soprano, clarinet, piano (1938)
Six Songs from the Hebrew (1936–1938, 1954)
Zwei Lieder für Bass und Klavier (1938)
Two Songs of Bialik (1938–1939)
Psalm 64 and Isaiah Chapter 35, soprano (1940)
Simple Music with Definitely Political Intentions for piano, band, or any other instrumental combination (1942)
Drei Lieder von Bertolt Brecht, alto (1943)
*Zwei Lieder aus Gedichte von Berthold Viertel, medium voice (1945)
Excerpts from Dr. Einstein's Address about Peace in the Atomic Era, medium voice (1950)
Apollo and Artemis, medium voice (1955)
The Angel, medium voice (1959)
Music for Medium Voice and Piano (1959)
Singables, medium voice (1959)
Under Green and Gold Step the Pioneer Bold (C.W. Post college song) (1959)
Täglich Schüttet Früh und Spät (undated)

Choral works
Prolog fur Troilus und Cressida, SATB, cornet, trombone (1929)
Bauernlie, unison chorus (1930)
Ballade von Karl Schmidt aus der Grauen Stadt, unison chorus, piano (1930)
Tsedaktem Habonim Hatseirim (You Were Right), SATB (1936)
Songs from Ballad of the Unknown Soldier, SATB (1937)
Two Chinese Epitaphs for Mixed Chorus and Drums (1937)
Bim Komotenu (We Have a Court of Justice), SATB (1938)
Shir Hanapach (Song of the Blacksmith), SATB (1938)
Two Choral Songs, soprano, alto (1944)
Three Pieces for Mixed Chorus with Words from the Bible and a Piece by Gershon Shofman, SATB (1954)
The Way A Crow, SATB (1958)
All-Wielding God, SATB, chamber ensemble (1959)
To a Theater New, low voice, SATB, piano or guitar (1961)
When Evening Falls (C. W. Post college song), SATB (undated)

References

Wolpe, Stefan, compositions by